Martin Edward Zweig (July 2, 1942 – February 18, 2013) was an American stock investor, investment adviser, and financial analyst. 

According to Forbes magazine, he was renowned for his "eccentric and lavish lifestyle" as well as having had the most expensive residence in the United States at the time, atop The Pierre on Fifth avenue in Manhattan.  It was listed on the New York City real estate market in 2004 for $70 million and in March 2013 for $125 million.  His particular investing methodology was based on selecting growth stocks that also have certain value characteristics, through a system that uses both fundamental analysis and market timing.  He died in 2013 at the age of 70.

Education
Zweig started buying stocks as a teenager, reputedly purchasing his first stock at age 13 and from that point on vowing to become a millionaire. Following high school, he earned degrees from three business schools, including a BSE from the Wharton School of the University of Pennsylvania in 1964, an MBA degree from the University of Miami School of Business in 1967, and a Ph.D. in finance from Michigan State University in 1969. He later taught finance at Iona College and Baruch College.

Winning on Wall Street
Zweig began his career in the 1970s as an investment newsletter writer and contributed numerous articles to Barron's Magazine. He went on to become a successful and influential investment adviser on Wall Street, known for his exhaustive data studies. In 1986, Zweig authored the book Winning on Wall Street. In it, he called Jesse Livermore one of his heroes and "one of the most fabulous traders of all time," recommending that people read the 1923 Edwin Lefèvre book Reminiscences of a Stock Operator.

Mutual fund manager
Zweig appeared regularly on PBS television's Wall $treet Week with Louis Rukeyser, and in 1992 he was voted into the program's Hall of Fame. It was on that very program that he stated on 16 October 1987, that he was deeply worried and did not like what he saw in the stock market. The 1987 stock market crash occurred on 19 October 1987.
At the time of his death Zweig was the chairman of Zweig-DiMenna Associates, Inc. He is also featured in John Reese's recent book, The Guru Investor: How to Beat the Market Using History's Best Investment Strategies.

Personal life
Although no cause of death was given in his obituary, Zweig had been treated for cancer, and underwent a liver transplant in 2010 with tissue from his younger son.

Bibliography

References

External links 
 Interactive Zweig Model
 Martin Zweig Unofficial Web Site.
 CNN Money

1942 births
American money managers
American financial analysts
Businesspeople from Cleveland
Stock and commodity market managers
University of Miami Business School alumni
Wharton School of the University of Pennsylvania alumni
20th-century American Jews
Michigan State University alumni
American investors
American stock traders
2013 deaths
20th-century American businesspeople
21st-century American Jews